Pretty Persuasion is a 2005 American black comedy film directed by Marcos Siega, written by Skander Halim, and starring Evan Rachel Wood, James Woods, Ron Livingston, Elisabeth Harnois, and Jane Krakowski. Its plot follows a 15-year-old student at an elite Beverly Hills academy who accuses her drama teacher of sexual harassment.

Plot
Kimberly Joyce is a precocious, narcissistic, sociopathic high school student at Roxbury Academy, an elite preparatory school in Beverly Hills. She and her best friend Brittany take Randa, a new Muslim student who recently emigrated from the Middle East, under their wing. Kimberly's home life is troubled; her bigoted and disaffected father Hank, an electronics executive, shows little interest in her life, while her vapid stepmother, Kathy, constantly attempts to reprimand her for her coarse language and attitude. Kimberly dreams of becoming an actress, and obtains a coveted role as Anne Frank in the school play.

The school drama teacher, Percy Anderson, orders Kimberly and Randa to after-school detention one day for disrupting class, and forces Kimberly to write an essay reflecting on her transgression. Percy takes the essay home that evening and has his wife, Grace, read it aloud provocatively as a role play before the two engage in sex. After Brittany is publicly humiliated by Percy during an acting exercise, Kimberly devises a plan to accuse him of sexually harassing each of them. Unable to afford an attorney, Percy agrees to his friend Roger - a clueless high school law teacher who passed the bar - acting as his attorney. In court, Roger proposes that the accusations are in retaliation to Kimberly having been replaced in the school play after referring to her Jewish classmate Josh's lawyer father as a "money-grubbing shyster."

The case becomes a media sensation covered extensively by Emily Klein, a local lesbian reporter. Shortly after the trial begins, Kimberly has a sexual encounter with Emily. She manipulates Josh with oral sex into convincing his father Larry, a renowned defense attorney, to defend Percy pro bono. When Larry cross examines Brittany, she confesses on the stand that she, Kimberly, and Randa fabricated the accusations. When Emily confronts her outside the courthouse, Kimberly reveals she filmed their sexual encounter, and uses it as blackmail to receive favorable press coverage.

Overwhelmed with the shame brought on her family by the false accusations, Randa shoots herself dead at school. Grace, now aware the essay Percy had her read was written by Kimberly, leaves him. In the storm of media coverage, Emily extolls Kimberly as a mere "victim" of society, and the ensuing press incites Hollywood producers to give Kimberly a bit part on a daytime soap opera.

When Brittany visits Kimberly at her house, Kimberly reveals she manipulated Josh into having his father defend Percy as she knew it would cause Brittany to buckle under pressure in court. When Brittany asks why, Kimberly explains that she devised the calculated plot to garner publicity for herself, as well as exact revenge against Brittany for having stolen her ex-boyfriend, Troy. Brittany lambasts her and leaves, vowing never to speak to her again. Kimberly turns on the television and sees herself on the episode of the soap opera. As she watches herself onscreen, tears begin streaming down her face.

Cast

Themes
The plot primarily focuses on sexual harassment accusations within a school system, as well as the repercussions of one 15-year-old girl's actions. But the film also makes commentary on many other social issues in contemporary American culture as well, many of them being controversial. Some of the topics that are commented on include racism, ignorance, discrimination, gender identity, homosexuality, intolerance, immigration, teenage behavior, suicide, parenting, deceit, narcissism and fascination with celebrity status and the entertainment industry.

Production notes

The musical score was composed by Gilad Benamram. The film deliberately does not feature any popular music songs. Similarly, the wardrobe and props do not feature contemporary branding.

Awards
 The film was nominated for the 2005 Grand Jury Prize at the Sundance Film Festival. 
 It won the German Independence Award (Audience Award) at the 2005 Oldenburg International Film Festival.

Critical reception
Roger Ebert called Pretty Persuasion "daring, and well-acted", but also said that it "exists uneasily somewhere between comedy and satire." Phil Villarreal of the Arizona Daily Star called the film a "scathing and hilarious social satire." While Stephen Holden of The New York Times praised the film: "An obscene, misanthropic go-for-broke satire, "Pretty Persuasion" is so gleefully nasty that the fact that it was even made and released is astonishing. Much of it is also extremely funny. Any satire worth its salt should not be afraid to offend, and "Pretty Persuasion" flings mud in all directions with a fearless audacity." James Mottram of Channel 4 opined, "Hovering uncomfortably between comedy and satire, Pretty Persuasion never quite gets the balance right." Carlo Cavagna thought it a "dark teen comedy that tries way too hard to be a dark teen comedy."

The Seattle Post-Intelligencer accused the film of being an "ugly, cheap attempt at satire", and Slant magazine called it "a pretty unpersuasive lecture". Adam Vary of The Advocate called the film "rife with political incorrectness." Critic Armond White deemed the film "ingenious."

The film has a "rotten" 33 percent rating at Rotten Tomatoes based on 79 reviews, with an average rating of 5/10. The site's consensus reads: "Pretty Persuasion aims for high satire but falls short of poignancy by depending on too much black humor, with too little redeeming humanity to provide balance".

References

External links
 
 
 
 
 Cincinnati City Beat: Happy Sundance Ending

2005 films
2005 black comedy films
2005 directorial debut films
2005 independent films
2005 LGBT-related films
2000s high school films
2000s teen comedy films
American black comedy films
American high school films
American independent films
American LGBT-related films
American teen comedy films
2000s English-language films
Female bisexuality in film
Films about narcissism
Films about sexual harassment
Films about suicide
Films directed by Marcos Siega
Films set in Beverly Hills, California
Films shot in Los Angeles
Lesbian-related films
LGBT-related black comedy films
2000s American films